Raz is a surname. Notable people with the name include:

 Adela Raz (born 1986), Afghan politician
 Aviad Raz, Israeli sociologist
 Guy Raz, US radio journalist
 Joseph Raz (1939–2022), legal, moral and political philosopher
 Kavi Raz (born 1953), Indian-British actor
 Lior Raz (born 1971), Israeli actor and screenwriter
 Mossi Raz (born 1965), Israeli politician
 Nahman Raz (1924–2015), Israeli politician
 Ran Raz (born 1966), professor of computer science at Princeton University
 Ruhama Raz (born 1955), Israeli singer